The A286 is an A class road in the south of England, from its northernmost point in Milford, Surrey, to Birdham, West Sussex. It passes through the market towns of Haslemere and Midhurst, and the cathedral city of Chichester. The road is mostly single carriageway, with a small dual carriageway section as part of the Chichester ring road.

Route

Surrey

The A286 begins at a junction with the A3100 (the old A3 London to Portsmouth road) in Milford. A few hundred metres south of its origin the A286 crosses the A283 road to Petworth, then crosses Witley Common, a Site of Special Scientific Interest. The route passes Witley Park and through the village centres of Brook and Grayswood before dropping down into Haslemere, passing Haslemere Educational Museum and Haslemere Town Hall, where it crosses the B2131 road leading west to Liphook and east to Petworth. The road rises steeply up Shepherd's Hill and down the other side, skirting the edge of Camelsdale (in the parish of Hammer) where it passes the southern end of the A287 before reaching the boundary with West Sussex.

West Sussex
Once in West Sussex, the route passes through Kingsley Green, a hamlet between Haslemere and Fernhurst, where the road was widened and straightened in the 1960s. This part of the route was turnpiked in the 18th century and was a toll road until 1864. The road crosses Friday's Hill and drops down through the village of Fernhurst.

After Fernhurst, the road continues downhill to Cooksbridge, where the road was widened in 1962 and an old bridge dated 1774 removed. It then crosses Henley Common; the road formerly passed through the hamlet of Henley up a narrow, steep lane, which was bypassed by an easier route in 1825. After passing a lane leading to the former Edward VII Hospital the road drops steeply once again until it reaches Easebourne, passing the former Bugdenor Lodge workhouse and joining the A272 from the east. At the north end of Midhurst, the road passes the edge of Cowdray Park and the ruins of Cowdray House as it crosses the River Rother. It splits with the A272 to the west in the town centre.

Three miles south of Midhurst the road crosses Cocking Causeway and passes through the village of Cocking. South of Cocking, the road rises steeply and crosses the South Downs Way trail, dropping down again to the village of Singleton, passing the Weald and Downland Open Air Museum. The route becomes less hilly as it reaches the coastal plain, passing through West Dean with West Dean College and Binderton, a hamlet in the Lavant Valley. After a junction with the B2141 road west to Harting and Petersfield, the road passes through Lavant and a mile further on reaches the outskirts of Chichester at Broyle.

At Chichester's Northgate, it is joined by the B2178 from the west, and then passes either side of the city centre, past Chichester railway station, the B2144 road to the east, and the A259 south coast road. Passing through Stockbridge, the southern outskirts of Chichester in the parish of Donnington, the road crosses the A27 Chichester Bypass. It then crosses the Chichester Canal (a few feet above the water, blocking the passage of the canal) and passes Chichester Marina on the eastern edge of Chichester Harbour. After a few more miles it reaches the village of Birdham, where it splits into two B-class roads - the B2179 to West Wittering and the B2198 to Bracklesham Bay.

References

Roads in England
Roads in Surrey
Roads in West Sussex